Mushtaq Hussain is a Pakistani politician who is member-elect of the Gilgit Baltistan Assembly.

Political career
Hussain contested 2020 Gilgit-Baltistan Assembly election on 15 November 2020 from constituency GBA-22 (Ghanche-I) as an Independent candidate. He won the election by the margin of 1,106 votes over the runner up Muhammad Ibrahim Sanai of Pakistan Tehreek-e-Insaf (PTI). He garnered 6,051 votes while Sanai received 4,945 votes. After winning the election, Hussain joined PTI.

References

Living people
Gilgit-Baltistan MLAs 2020–2025
Politicians from Gilgit-Baltistan
Year of birth missing (living people)